Jamaica competed in the 2014 Commonwealth Games in Glasgow, Scotland from 23 July – 3 August 2014.

Medalists

Athletics

Men

Women

Combined events – Heptathlon

Badminton

Mixed team

Pool E

Cycling

Mountain biking

Road

Women

Track
Sprint

Pursuit

Time trial

Points race

Scratch race

Diving

Men

Netball

Pool A

Swimming

Men

Women

Triathlon

References

Nations at the 2014 Commonwealth Games
Jamaica at the Commonwealth Games
2014 in Jamaican sport